Neo Chorio (lit. "new village" in Greek) may refer to:

 Neo Chorio, Nicosia, a village in northern Cyprus
 Neo Chorio, Paphos, a village in western Cyprus
 Neo Chorio, Crete, a village in Crete, Greece

See also
 Neochori